Coptus may refer to:
 Qift, a place in Egypt
 Coptus (weevil), a beetle genus in the tribe Rhyncolini